Joseph Adam Jonas (born August 15, 1989) is an American singer, songwriter, and actor. He rose to fame as a member of the pop rock band the Jonas Brothers, alongside his brothers Kevin and Nick. The group released their debut studio album It's About Time through the Columbia label in 2006, which failed to achieve commercial success. After signing with Hollywood Records, the group released their self-titled second studio album in 2007, which became their breakthrough record. The band became prominent figures on the Disney Channel during this time, gaining a large following through the network: they appeared in the widely successful musical television film Camp Rock (2008) and its sequel Camp Rock 2: The Final Jam (2010) as well as two of their own series, Jonas Brothers: Living the Dream (2008–2010) and Jonas (2009–2010).

The band's third studio album, A Little Bit Longer (2008), saw continued commercial success for the group; the album's lead single "Burnin' Up" hit the top five on the Billboard Hot 100 chart. Their fourth studio album, while still successful on the Billboard 200 chart, saw a decline in record sales. After the group confirmed a hiatus, Joe released his debut solo studio album, Fastlife (2011), which saw moderate commercial success. After the Jonas Brothers officially parted ways due to creative differences, Jonas formed the funk-pop band DNCE in 2015, serving as the lead vocalist. The group saw the significant commercial success of their debut single "Cake by the Ocean", which peaked at number 9 on the Billboard Hot 100 chart in the United States.

Early life
Joseph Adam Jonas was born on August 15, 1989. in Casa Grande, Arizona, the son of Denise (née Miller) and Paul Kevin Jonas. His father is a songwriter, musician, and former ordained minister at an Assemblies of God church while his mother is a former sign language teacher and singer. He has an older brother, Kevin, and two younger brothers, Nick and Frankie. In 2002, Joe appeared in Baz Luhrmann's Broadway production of La bohème.

Career

2005–2007: Breakthrough with Jonas Brothers

In 2005, Joe, Kevin, and Nick recorded Please Be Mine, their first song recorded. Upon hearing the song, the Columbia Records president Steve Greenberg decided to sign the brothers as a group. They considered naming their group "Sons of Jonas" before settling on the name Jonas Brothers. While working on their debut studio album, the band toured throughout 2005 with artists such as Jump5, Kelly Clarkson, Jesse McCartney, the Backstreet Boys, and The Click Five among others. The group released their debut single, "Mandy", in December 2005. The album was initially scheduled for a February 2006 release date, though executive changes at Columbia's parent company Sony led to numerous delays on the project's release. During this time, the group began making appearances on various Disney Channel related soundtracks and toured with Aly & AJ throughout 2006. The band's debut album, It's About Time (2006), was released on August 8, 2006. The album received little backing from the label, who had no further interest in promoting the band. The album's second single, "Year 3000", had its music video premiere on the Disney Channel in the beginning of 2007. Dissatisfied with how the release of the record was handled, the band hoped to depart from Columbia Records and find a new label; it was later confirmed in 2007 that the group had been dropped by the label. The album went on to sell a total of 67,000 copies in the United States.

Only a short period of time after their departure from Columbia Records, it was confirmed that the group had signed a new contract with Hollywood Records. While working on their new album, the group continued to gain popularity due to soundtrack appearances and promotional appearances. The group released their self-titled second studio album through Hollywood Records on August 7, 2007. The album entered the top five of the Billboard 200 in the United States, going on to sell over two million copies in the country. Joe and his brothers made their acting debut on an August 17 episode of the Disney series Hannah Montana titled "Me and Mr. Jonas and Mr. Jonas and Mr. Jonas". The band performed the collaboration "We Got the Party" with lead actress Miley Cyrus, with the episode gaining over ten million viewers and became basic cable's most watched series telecast ever. The group's single "S.O.S" became their first top twenty hit on the Billboard Hot 100, and has sold over 1.5 million copies in the country, they put out Hold On, When You Look Me in the Eyes among singles.

2008–2010: Acting

In May 2008, he and the band began starring in their own Documentary series Jonas Brothers: Living the Dream. Jonas made his film debut along with his brothers in the Disney Channel film Camp Rock (2008). The film's soundtrack was released on July 17, 2008, and sold 188,000 copies in its first week of release in the United States. Joe recorded the duet "This Is Me" for the project, with the song reaching the top ten of the Billboard Hot 100 chart. The song served as Jonas' first release outside of the Jonas Brothers. It has sold just over 900,000 copies in the United States. The Jonas Brothers' third studio album, A Little Bit Longer, was released in the United States on August 12, 2008. The album became their first to debut at number one on the Billboard 200 chart, selling over 525,000 copies in its first week of release. The album went on to sell over two million copies in the United States, making it their second multi-platinum album. The album was preceded by the release of the single "Burnin' Up" (2008), which became the band's first top five hit in the United States. Love Bug, Tonight were put out among singles. Joe and his brothers starred in the 3D biopic Jonas Brothers: The 3D Concert Experience, which received a theatrical release on February 27, 2009. The film was a financial success and is the sixth highest-grossing concert film.

Jonas starred with all three of his brothers their second Disney Channel series, Jonas, which made its debut on May 2, 2009. The show's second and final season aired under the name Jonas L.A. The band released their fourth studio album, entitled Lines, Vines and Trying Times, on June 16, 2009. The project debuted at the top spot on the Billboard 200, boasting first week sales of 247,000 copies.Paranoid and Fly with Me were put out as singles. Joe was featured as a guest judge on a January 2010 episode of the ninth season of the singing competition American Idol. In February 2010, Jonas made a cameo appearance in Vampire Weekend's music video for "Giving Up the Gun" along with Jake Gyllenhaal, Lil Jon, and RZA. He later guest starred in a 2010 episode of Hot In Cleveland as Valerie Bertinelli's son, Will. Jonas starred in the sequel Camp Rock 2: The Final Jam.

2011–2014: Fastlife and group disbandment
In 2011, it was announced that Jonas was planning on recording a solo album. Jonas hoped to incorporate elements of funk into the album. Jonas released the album's lead single, titled "See No More", made in collaboration with Chris Brown on June 3, 2011. The single failed to have much commercial success, only reaching ninety-two on the Billboard Hot 100 chart. On August 4, 2011, Jonas announced via Twitter that he would join Britney Spears on her European tour starting October 16, 2011. Ryan Seacrest premiered the album's second single, "Just in Love", on September 9, 2011. The single was later remixed to include rapper Lil Wayne. Jonas later confirmed the album to be titled Fastlife. In support of the album, Joe co-headlined with Jay Sean in the Joe Jonas & Jay Sean Tour with JoJo as the opening act. The tour kicked off on September 9, 2011, and concluded on October 6, 2011. Fastlife was released through Hollywood Records on October 11, 2011. The album sold a total of 18,000 copies in its first week of release, debuting at number fifteen on the Billboard 200. The album quickly fell off of the albums chart, going on to sell a mere 45,000 copies by 2015. On May 1, 2012, it was announced that both the Jonas Brothers and Joe Jonas had parted ways with Hollywood Records.

It was confirmed in April 2013 that the Jonas Brothers would reunite to begin working on their fifth studio album and an upcoming tour. Kevin Jonas later starred in his own E! reality series, Married to Jonas, which focused on his marriage to new wife Danielle. The show featured appearances from Joe and Nick and documented the band's preparations for their musical comeback. That same year, Jonas participated in Fox's dating game show The Choice. Jonas began dating model Blanda Eggenschwiler in September 2012, with the two dating until July 2014. Jonas co-wrote the song "Dreams" for the John Legend album Love in the Future (2013). The brothers performed in Russia in September 2012, making it their first live performance since their 2010 tour. Their much-anticipated reunion concert, which had been announced in August 2012, took place on October 11, 2012, at Radio City Music Hall in New York City. The band's fifth studio album, set to be released independently through their own label, was slated for release in 2013. The Jonas Brothers also announced an upcoming North American tour, with tickets going on sale. The album, initially titled V,Live included the previously released singles, "Pom Poms" and "First Time". On October 9, 2013, the group cancelled their upcoming tour days before it was slated to start, citing a "deep rift within the band" over "creative differences". Only days later, it was confirmed that the band had officially ended.

2015–2018: DNCE and The Voice 

With the band officially broken up, Jonas began working on a new musical project with producers such as Malay and Mattman & Robin. While working on the project, Jonas was unsure whether he wanted to record a second studio album or start a new band. Upon working with Justin Tranter on multiple songs, Jonas decided to form a band with his friends and former touring partners Jack Lawless and JinJoo Lee. Cole Whittle, a member of the alternative rock band Semi Precious Weapons, became the fourth and final member of the group. The group named themselves DNCE, a misspelling of the word dance. DNCE released their debut single, "Cake by the Ocean", in 2015. Their Swaay debut extended play was released in October 2015.Their self title DNCE album was later released. It debuted at number seventy-nine on the Billboard 200 chart in the United States but peaked at number nine.

In 2018, he joined the Australian version of The Voice as a coach, a year after being a mentor on the American version. In June 2018, Jonas and British DJ Jonas Blue released their collaborative track "I See Love", a song for the film Hotel Transylvania 3: Summer Vacation. He also voiced a character called Kraken in the movie.

2019–present: Jonas Brothers reunion

Starting in late January, rumors were swirling on Twitter and other social media that the three brothers were going to reform the Jonas Brothers. On February 28, 2019, the Jonas Brothers officially announced their return along with a new single, "Sucker", which released the next day, March 1. In April 2019, Joe Jonas appeared at WE Day California, portions of which were aired on ABC in August of the same year.

In January 2021, it was announced that Jonas was among the cast of the Korean War movie Devotion. During March 2021, the filming took place on Tybee Island, Georgia. The movie, which is expected to premiere in 2022, also had filming on Arthur Ravenel Jr. Bridge in Charleston, South Carolina during May 2021. He has called his joining the cast of Devotion a "life changing" experience. In September 2022, it was announced that Jonas had co-authored a song titled Not Alone for the credits of the movie, calling the song "One of the favorites that I've ever written" and labeling the song as "spiritual".

In February 2022, Jonas announced the return of DNCE along with Lawless and Lee. Jonas announced the return of the band with a new song by Norwegian DJ Kygo, titled Dancing Feet, which was released on February 25, 2022.

Personal life
Jonas dated AJ Michalka for almost a year after he went on tour with her group Aly & AJ in late 2005 to 2006. Jonas dated singer-songwriter Taylor Swift for a few months in 2008. Jonas dated actress Camilla Belle, who appeared in the Jonas Brothers' "Lovebug" music video, for a few months mid 2009. Jonas briefly dated singer Demi Lovato in the beginning of 2010. He started dating actress Ashley Greene in summer 2010, but they broke up in March 2011. He then dated graphic designer Blanda Eggenschwiler from 2012 to 2014. Jonas and model Gigi Hadid dated in 2015. She co-directed Jonas' band music video DNCE "Cake by the Ocean".

Jonas started dating English actress Sophie Turner in 2016. They got engaged in October 2017, and married on May 1, 2019, in Las Vegas, Nevada. They held their second wedding in Paris, France on June 29, 2019. The couple have two daughters.

In April 2020, Jonas and his wife donated 100 meals to doctors and frontline health workers who were working during the COVID-19 pandemic in California at a Los Angeles hospital.

In May 2021, Jonas made 250 replicas of his right hand to promote, along with travel agency Expedia Group, the return to travel by Americans who felt uncertainty and were unsure of resuming travel due to the COVID-19 pandemic in the United States. Jonas also promoted donations to frontline health workers and urged mental health care for those affected during the pandemic.

In September 2021, Jonas and wife Turner purchased a mansion in Miami, Florida for $11 million. The mansion was reportedly inspired by architect Frank Lloyd Wright. Prior to moving to Miami, Jonas and Turner sold their house in Encino, a neighborhood of Los Angeles, for $15.2 million. In November 2022, the Jonases' Miami residence was listed for sale with an asking price of nearly $17 million.

Jonas announced, in June 2022, that he would join an environmental campaign by the Texas Department of Transportation named Don't Mess with Texas, to encourage people against littering while travelling on the road. Jonas also is a spokesperson for STAAR Surgical, a company which implants lenses to replace common and lens glasses.

Discography

Solo albums
Fastlife (2011)

with the Jonas Brothers
It's About Time (2006)
Jonas Brothers (2007)
A Little Bit Longer (2008)
Lines, Vines and Trying Times (2009)
Happiness Begins (2019)

with DNCE
 DNCE (2016)

Filmography

Film

Television

Web

Awards and nominations

References

External links

 

1989 births
21st-century American male actors
Male actors from New Jersey
American male film actors
American male singer-songwriters
American male television actors
American male voice actors
American people of French-Canadian descent
Jonas Brothers members
Living people
Singer-songwriters from New Jersey
People from Wyckoff, New Jersey
Participants in American reality television series
People from Casa Grande, Arizona
Hollywood Records artists
DNCE members
21st-century American singers
Jonas family
American people of English descent
American people of German descent
American people of Irish descent
American people of Italian descent
American people of Scottish descent
Singer-songwriters from Arizona